Nina Carita Björnström-Lehtonen (born c. 1966) was Miss Finland for 1988 and competed in the 1988 Miss Universe pageant. She was 1st runner up in the 1989 Miss Scandinavia pageant.

References

External links

 

1960s births
Flight attendants
Living people
Miss Finland winners
Miss Universe 1988 contestants
Swedish-speaking Finns
Miss World 1988 delegates